Martigues ( in classical norm, Lou Martegue in Mistralian norm) is a commune northwest of Marseille. It is part of the Bouches-du-Rhône department in the Provence-Alpes-Côte d'Azur region on the eastern end of the Canal de Caronte.

A direct translation from the Martigues Tourisme website reveals the following about Martigues:

Nicknamed the "Provençale Venice", Martigues is a point of passage between the Mediterranean Sea and the Sea of Martigues (now Etang de Berre), close to the Côte d'Azur. The charm of its canals, its docks and bridges made it "The Venice of Provence". Martigues possesses also its cooperative winery "La Venise provençale": Coteaux d'Aix en Provence, rosé, red and white wines, fruit juices and natural oils in the region. Main varietals: Grenache, Syrah, Cinsault, Carignan, Clairette.

History
Martigues was founded by Ramon Berenguer IV, count of Provence in 1232 on the likely site of the Roman camp Maritima Avaticorum.

Population

Transport
The Gare de Martigues railway station is served by regional trains between Miramas and Marseille.

The nearest airport is Marseille Provence Airport (MRS), which is 14.52 km (9 miles) away.

CroisiEurope runs river cruises between Martigues (dock near Avenue Louis Sammut, behind City Hall) and either Lyon or Chalon-sur-Saône.

People 
Gerard Thom (Frère Gérard), founder of the Knights Hospitaller
Etienne Auteman / Authement, City Attorney 1700
Étienne Richaud (1841-1889), Principal private secretary (Gambetta's Ministry), Governor of La Réunion, Governor General for Inde française
Charles Maurras (1868-1952), poet and political theorist
Éric Bernard, Formula-1 driver
Jimmy Abdou, footballer
Ali Ahamada, footballer
Barket Bekrar. footballer
Maurice Dalé, footballer
Rod Fanni, footballer
Foued Kadir, footballer
André-Pierre Gignac, footballer
Azzouz Kara, retired professional footballer
Clara Luciani, singer
Amor Kehiha, footballer
Imany, singer
Giacomo and Gilles Coustellier, both multiple mountainbike trials world champions
Yusuf Sari, footballer
Philippe Didier Prout, firefighter

See also
FC Martigues - Local football club.
Étang de Berre
Communes of the Bouches-du-Rhône department

References

External links

Official website

Communes of Bouches-du-Rhône
Avatici
Populated coastal places in France